The 1982–83 Southwestern Louisiana Ragin' Cajuns men's basketball team represented the University of Southwestern Louisiana as an NCAA Independent during the 1982–83 NCAA Division I men's basketball season. The Ragin' Cajuns, led by 6th-year head coach Bobby Paschal, played their home games at Blackham Coliseum in Lafayette, Louisiana. The team received an at-large bid to the NCAA tournament. As the No. 8 seed in the East region, SW Louisiana was defeated by Rutgers in the opening round, 60–53.

Roster

Schedule and results

|-
!colspan=9 style=| Regular season

|-
!colspan=9 style=| NCAA Tournament

Source

References

Louisiana Ragin' Cajuns men's basketball seasons
Southwestern Louisiana
Southwestern Louisiana